GÖKTUĞ is a Turkish program by TÜBİTAK-SAGE to develop four variants of air-to-air missiles that are to be launched from F-16s as well as future Turkish indigenous Hürjets and TF-Xs. These missiles are going to be Turkey's first indigenous air-to-air missiles. Bozdoğan (Merlin) are short-range infrared homing and Gökdoğan (Peregrine) are beyond visual range active radar homing missiles. Both missiles were successfully flight-tested in 2018. The missiles are also planned to be integrated on Bayraktar AKINCI and Bayraktar Kızılelma, indigenously developed Turkish UCAVs.

Bozdoğan (Merlin) 
It will have High thrust reduced smoke solid propellant technology and an electronic rocket motor aiming and firing system. According to the manufacturer it will have advanced agility due to its  thrust vectoring, a unique warhead for maximum probability of kill and a reliable fuze. It will be compatible to the MIL-STD-1553 and MIL-STD-1760 military standards and is designed for use with the LAU-129 guided missile launcher.

On 14th of April 2021 Merlin conducted a live firing test from a Turkish Airforce F-16. The missile successfully destroyed a TAI Şimşek target drone with pinpoint accuracy.

The Bozdogan reaches a speed of greater than Mach 4.

Gökdoğan (Peregrine) 
The Peregrine is a BVRAAM (Beyond Visual Range Air-to-Air Missile) with an estimated range of 35nm (65km) and said to have a similar performance to that of the American AIM-120 AMRAAM. It has a solid-state active radio frequency  smart seeker with fire and forget capability and electronic counter-countermeasures and will be using all aspect engagement capable home on jam techniques with data link update capable data link using  lock-on after launch techniques. In the words of the manufacturer, it will have high thrust with reduced smoke solid propellant technology and completely electronic safe and reliable rocket motor arming and firing system. It too will have a design to maximize probability of kill and its fuze too will be reliable. It will be compatible to the MIL-STD-1553 and MIL-STD-1760 military standards and is designed for use with the LAU-129 guided missile launcher.

Gökhan (Skykhan) 

The development of an air-to-air missile powered by ramjet engine was officially announced in August 2021. The director of the TÜBİTAK SAGE Gürcan Okumuş stated the completion of more than 100 tests that carried the firing of the new ramjet engine.

References 
 

 Air-to-air missiles of Turkey
 Post–Cold War weapons of Turkey
 Weapons of Turkey